Octagonal is a holding company headquartered in London. The company is listed on the London Stock Exchange and is a constituent of the FTSE AIM All-Share Index. Octagonal currently has a 100% stake in Global Investment Strategy UK Ltd or 'GIS', and is a financial services company, member of the London Stock Exchange.

History 
Octagonal was founded in 2007 as an investment company, and acquired a 9.97% stake in Global Investment Strategy in April 2014. In 2015, Octagonal announced it had entered into a conditional agreement to acquire the remaining issued share capital of GIS. Octagonal raised £1.7 million through a placing of new shares, and the acquisition constituted a reverse takeover under the AIM Rules for Companies.

Global Investment Strategy UK Ltd was founded in 2002 and established in its current form in 2004, by city deal maker John Gunn. The company received FCA approval to provide brokerage services in April 2011, spread betting and CFDs in December 2011 and in January 2012, permission was granted to provide payment services activities and is now an Authorised Payment Institution (API).

GIS is authorised to offer a broad scope  of  settlement, custody,  banking,  broking and  advisory services to professional, retail, corporate and eligible counterparty clients, and has over 100 counterparty relationships, including most of the major local and international investments banks transacting in the UK. In addition to its core business of global settlement and custodial services, GIS has an investment management division through appointed representative Private Capital Advisors, managing funds for both domestic and overseas clients on a discretionary basis. In June 2015, Octagonal Plc to acquireg Global Investment Strategy.

In March 2017, Octagonal opened an office in Hong Kong, in order to offer its custody and settlements services to customers in South East Asia. In the same month, Octagonal incorporated SynerGIS Capital Ltd as a majority owned subsidiary. The company will engage in commercial asset backed lending.

In November 2017, GIS announced the soft launch of the SynerGIS Bond, a fixed-rate bond offered to retail investors. This period also saw the declaration of Octagonal's maiden dividend after reporting a strong growth in revenues, up 33% as reported in the company's March 2017 Annual results.

This growth saw GIS listed in the INC.5000 Europe's fastest-growing private companies with a 214% increase in three-year revenues, in September 2017.

Operations 
Global Investment Strategy UK Ltd or "GIS" is a financial services company headquartered in London. It is a member of the London Stock Exchange and is regulated by the Financial Conduct Authprity. GIS is also a HMRC Authorised ISA Manager.

Since 2015, GIS has administered over a quarter of a million transactions with settlement values exceeding £50 billion.

GIS' principal services include:
 Investment Management
 Stockbroking
 Clearing and Safe Custody
 Payment Services
 Corporate Finance
The group is committed to providing additional services for its existing clients and facilitating technological investments.

References

External links 
 Octagonal plc
 Global Investment Strategy UK Ltd
 SynerGIS

Companies listed on the London Stock Exchange
Payment service providers
Holding companies of the United Kingdom
2007 establishments in England
Financial services companies established in 2007
Companies based in the City of London